Vexed is a British comedy-drama, police procedural television series for BBC Two that aired in 2010 and 2012.

Created and written by Howard Overman, the first series starred Lucy Punch as D.I. Kate Bishop and Toby Stephens as D.I. Jack Armstrong, a detective duo with a fractious relationship. Jack is lazy and disorganised but charming, whereas Kate is efficient and usually exasperated by Jack's way of doing things. The show also starred Rory Kinnear, who plays Kate's husband Dan, with whom she is going through marriage counselling. Other recurring characters are Naz, an eccentric crime scene specialist, and Tony, owner of the bar at which the characters relax. The drama is set in contemporary London.

Next series
In the second series (first announced on 18 January 2012) Punch and Kinnear did not return. Lucy's character was replaced by Miranda Raison playing D.I. Georgina Dixon, with Nick Dunning playing her father, a retired policeman with a dubious security business. The portrayal of Jack in the second series has him being a bit more competent and less comedically over-the-top than in the first series, but still having sufficient character traits to consistently annoy his new partner. She has her own personality issues, which Jack is quick to point out.

Cast

Toby Stephens as D.I. Jack Armstrong
Lucy Punch as D.I. Kate Bishop (series 1)
Rory Kinnear as Dan Bishop, Kate's husband (series 1)
Ronny Jhutti as Naz Omar
Roger Griffiths as Tony
Miranda Raison as D.I. Georgina Dixon (series 2)
Nick Dunning as Peter Dixon, Georgina's father (series 2)
Patrick Baladi as Mark Armstrong, Jack's brother (series 2)
Ashley Artus as Tim (series 1: episode 2)

Production
The series was filmed in South West London, in particular Kingston upon Thames, Richmond on Thames, and Twickenham. Some of the second series filmed in Ireland.

Series 1, Episode 2 (TX 22-8-2010) was extensively filmed in the grounds and interior of Stoke Court (Stoke Poges). This had earlier served as Bayer Group UK's conference centre and laboratories.
 
The first series was produced by Greenlit Rights Productions and the second is produced by Eleventh Hour Films.

During the UK transmission of the programme in July 2010, it was reported that Greenlit had entered administration.

The theme tune for the series one was composed by Willie Dowling, former keyboardist with rock group The Wildhearts.

DVD releases
Series One was released by Acorn Media UK on 20 August 2012.
Series Two was released exclusively by Acorn Media UK on their website in December 2012 and was released elsewhere on 4 March 2013.
Series One and Two boxset was released by Acorn Media UK on 8 July 2013.

Critical reception
The first series received a mixed response from critics.

The Liverpool Echos Paddy Shennan called it "deliciously black" and added that it could become a "cop classic". He also praised Stephens's performance, likening it to Leslie Nielsen's in The Naked Gun.

The Guardians Sam Wollaston also liked it, saying "It's cheeky, irreverent, puerile, sometimes inappropriate. It also made me laugh, almost out loud a few times, and that's no bad thing in a comedy" and again praised Stephens's "fabulous" acting, while Punch's performance was "excellent".

He asserted: 
"Toby Stephens is fabulous as übertwerp Jack. He has a nice, pleased-as-punch-with-himself complacency, changing his voice and raising an eyebrow when he talks to ladies. There's a hint of self-doubt there, but not enough to stop him being a total cock. And Lucy Punch as Kate is excellent at being appalled by him, but also just a tiny bit impressed, even attracted to him. Together they're wonderfully awful."

Most others disagreed with this. The Metro called it "rubbish" and said Stephens's acting was "over the top" The Daily Telegraphs Patrick Smith lamented its "[t]huddingly lame humour", Rachel Cooke of the New Statesman called it "atrocious". "Truly abysmal" said Kevin Myers of the Irish Independent while Sean Myers blamed "a sub-standard script totally lacking in style and imagination". and Damien Love of The Herald (Glasgow) said it was "[b]ad beyond belief... one of the worst things I have ever seen on television.", and likened Toby Stephen's performance to "Hugh Grant doing an impression of Ross Kemp, doing an impression of Hugh Grant doing an impression of Bodie from The Professionals", although he believed there was a chance that Lucy Punch was "wasted" in the show.

Episodes

Series One (2010)

Series Two (2012)

Series two of Vexed was broadcast Wednesdays at 9pm at the same time as the London Olympic games. Episode five was broadcast at the same time as the opening ceremony of the London Paralympics games.

Both Series One and Two are available on Netflix in Canada, the U.K. & U.S.

References

External links

Facebook - Vexed Fan Page

2010 British television series debuts
2012 British television series endings
BBC television dramas
BBC high definition shows
English-language television shows
Television shows set in the Republic of Ireland
Detective television series
British detective television series